Dallimore is a surname. Notable people with the name include:

 Arthur Henry Dallimore (1873–1970), New Zealand Pentecostal minister and British-Israelite
 Brian Dallimore (born 1973), American baseball player
 Ceri Dallimore, Welsh sport shooter
 Chloe Dallimore, Australian actor, singer and dancer
 Helen Dallimore (born 1971), Australian actress
 Maurice Dallimore (1912–1973), English actor
 William Dallimore (1871–1959), English botanist